Major-General George Dean-Pitt, KH (1781 or 1772 – 8 January 1851) was Lieutenant-Governor of the former New Zealand Province of New Ulster from 14 February 1848 to his death on 8 January 1851.

Early life
He was born George Dean, the  illegitimate son of George Pitt, 2nd Baron Rivers.

During his military career before arriving in New Zealand, Dean-Pitt, at the time a Major, was stationed (January – September 1828) at Malta with the 80th Regiment of Foot (Staffordshire Volunteers).

Arrival in New Zealand
Dean-Pitt arrived with his family on the barque Minerva at Auckland on 8 October 1847. He was the second most important military man in the new colony during the governorship of George Grey. His son and two of his sons-in-law were part of the military establishment as well. His residence was located in Pitt Street, which had originally been called Pyt Street after a childhood home of the first governor William Hobson, it is likely the spelling changed because of Dean Pitt's presence.

Ill for some time, he died on 8 January 1851 while Lieutenant-Governor and was buried with full military honours in the Symonds Street Cemetery in Auckland. A number of retail businesses in Auckland closed for the day of his funeral.

Personal life
In 1818 he married Susan Baillie (1797–1875) in Bristol, England. In 1819 he adopted the surname Dean-Pitt by Royal Licence.

Children 
Emelia Marie Dean-Pitt (20 June 1820 – 5 April 1877) m. 23 May 1848 at St. Paul's Church, Auckland, Captain J.H.Laye
Lieutenant-General George Dean-Pitt (C.B.) (1 June 1822 or 14 January 1823 – 4 April 1883) m. 22 November 1842 Louisa Jones (18 February 1816 – 8 July 1889).
Georgiana Dean-Pitt (1822 – 23 May 1877)
Louisa Dean-Pitt (1823 – 7 April 1873) m. 18 November 1848 Lieutenant George Hyde Page, at St. Paul's Church, Auckland
Susan Dean-Pitt (born Malta 1828)
 Douglas Charles Dean-Pitt (born 1829 Ireland) m: 10 Dec 1878 Alice Antoinette Birdwood at Mahableshwar, Bombay, India.
Charlotte Marcia Dean-Pitt (6 March 1830 – 7 April 1873) m. 18 November 1848 Captain Charles Lavallin Nugent, at St. Paul's Church, Auckland
William Augustus Dean-Pitt (1833 – 8 November 1890) m.  11 Jun 1863 Anne Isabella Lloyd Gellibrand at Hobart, Tasmania, Australia. He was buried in Symonds Street Cemetery next to his father..
Clara Eliza Dean-Pitt (5 September 1838 at Bristol – 1916 Kensington England, unmarried.)
Susan Dean-Pitt (born 14 July 1847)

References 

1772 births
1851 deaths
British Army generals
British colonial governors and administrators in Oceania
Burials at Symonds Street Cemetery
1840s in New Zealand
Members of the New Zealand Legislative Council (1841–1853)
George Dean